The Étang de Santa Giulia is a coastal lagoon in the Corse-du-Sud department of France.

Location

The Étang de Santa Giulia extends along the west shore of the Golfe de Santa Giulia to the south of the village of Santa Giulia.
It lies between the T10 highway and the sea, and is south of Porto-Vecchio.
It is fed at the south end by the Ruisseau de Punta Rossa Vignarellu and the smaller seasonal Ruisseau d'Alzellu.

Conservation status

The Étang de Santa Giulia and land that surrounds it has been designated as a Zone naturelle d'intérêt écologique, faunistique et floristique (ZNIEFF), covering .
This is past of a larger  Terrestrial Protected Area of land acquired by Conservatoire du Littoral (national seaside and lakeside conservancy).

See also

List of waterbodies of Corse-du-Sud

Notes

Sources

Lagoons of Corsica